The Kallang River is the longest river in Singapore, flowing for 10 kilometers.            from the Lower Peirce Reservoir (originally named "Kallang River Reservoir") to the Kallang Basin. It originates in the planning area of Central Water Catchment, flows in a southeast direction through Bishan and Toa Payoh, before finally arriving in Kallang.

Prior to extensive land reclamation along Singapore's southeastern coast, the Kallang River used to empty into the Singapore Straits at the Kallang Basin, near where Merdeka Bridge is standing. Today, the Kallang River flows into the open sea via the Marina Channel.

Tributaries of the Kallang River include Sungei Whampoa, the Pelton Canal, and the Bukit Timah Second Diversion Canal. Other rivers that empty into the Kallang Basin, other than the Kallang River, include the Geylang River and Rochor River. All these aforementioned waterways form part of the Marina Reservoir, as a result of the Marina Barrage.

The Kallang Park Connector of the Park Connector Network (PCN) runs almost parallel to the Kallang River, providing a stretch of recreational space along the river. The Kallang Riverside Park straddles both sides of the Kallang River near the river mouth.

History

In pre-colonial times, the aboriginal Biduanda Orang Kallang tribe lived in the swamps at the mouth of the Kallang River, and fished from their boats, seldom venturing out into the open sea. At the time of Sir Stamford Raffles landing in Singapore in 1819, half of the population of 1,000 were the Orang Kallang.

Kallang River was also the place, where in the early days the Bugis traders from Sulawesi (Celebes) unloaded their cargoes of spices and tortoise shells, gold dust and slaves from their palari or their leteh-leteh. These sailing boats were a common sight off the sea front even up to the 1960s.

Today, this long, winding river has little or no industry except for a short distance, although a new industrial estate at Kallang Basin, near Kallang Bahru, has been built.

John Scripps and Leong Siew Chor

John Scripps and Leong Siew Chor murdered many people and dumped their bodies into the river. These two criminals were executed in Changi Prison.

Tributaries

Pelton Canal
The Pelton Canal is a canalised river that flows from Ubi via MacPherson into the Kallang River in Kallang. It is one of the numerous tributaries of the Kallang River.

A section of the underground Kallang-Paya Lebar Expressway (KPE) follows the course of the Pelton Canal.

Sungei Whampoa
Sungei Whampoa (Malay for "Whampoa River") begins in Whampoa, near Jalan Rajah, and flows into the Kallang River in Kallang.

Bukit Timah Second Diversion Canal
The Bukit Timah Second Diversion Canal is a canalised river flowing from Whampoa to Kallang, following closely the path of the Pan Island Expressway (PIE). It joins the Kallang River near the traffic interchange at Whampoa Flyover.

Others
Other than those listed above, there is another unnamed Kallang River tributary in Toa Payoh. It flows from Braddell Road, via Toa Payoh North and Lorong 6 Toa Payoh, before meeting the Kallang River at Lorong 8 Toa Payoh.

Redevelopment
Kallang River is now part of the water catchment area for the Marina Reservoir. A dam, the Marina Barrage, was built at the mouth of the Marina Channel at Marina South. With the completion of the Marina Barrage in 2008, the entire region comprising the basins of the Singapore River, Rochor River, Geylang River and Kallang River has transformed into a water catchment area.

In April 2006, the Singapore government announced plans to give a 200-metre stretch of the Kallang River at Kolam Ayer a S$2.5 million facelift.

The "demonstration project" by the National Parks Board (NParks) and the Public Utilities Board (PUB) is part of the Active, Beautiful and Clean Waters Programme to transform rivers and reservoirs into vibrant community hubs, and to get Singaporeans to cherish and take care of their waterways. NParks and the PUB reviewed some of the world's best rivers such as the Charles River in the United States and the Cheonggye Stream in Seoul to draw inspiration and learn best practices.

By August 2007, the Kolam Ayer stretch of the river was transformed to include more greenery, floating decks, pathways and boardwalks for recreational activities. A water wheel was introduced as the centrepiece of the project. The water level was kept at a constant level — 3 metres deep — making activities such as kayaking and dragon boating possible.

Kallang River at Bishan-Ang Mo Kio Park

The upstream of the Kallang River is located at Bishan-Ang Mo Kio Park. Officially opened on 17 March 2012 by Prime Minister Lee Hsien Loong, the meandering river's capacity is now 40% more than when it was a canal. The river helps to slow the flow of rainwater so that downstream waterways have more time to drain. Bio-engineering techniques such as soil bioengineering and intensive hydraulic calculations were applied to create this. Besides slowing down rainwater, it now also offers residents a new recreational experience – soft planted river banks encourage people to get close to the water.

See also

 Kallang River body parts murder

References

External references
Norman Edwards, Peter Keys (1996), Singapore - A Guide to Buildings, Streets, Places, Times Books International, 
Today, Making a splash with $2.5m, 17 April 2006,

Rivers of Singapore
Kallang
Bishan, Singapore
Toa Payoh
Central Water Catchment